= Robert Jaeckel =

American judo practitioner

Robert "Bob" "Robbie" Jaeckel was a former national level competitor in the sport of Judo.

Jaeckel competed in Judo at an early age. and won 4 straight state titles by 1973. He earned a silver in 1983 and a 1977 bronze medal in the US National Championships in the sport of Judo. He earned a bronze in the 1983 US Open.
